The Intersection: Contact (stylized in all caps) is the third extended play by South Korean boy band BDC and the final release from their The Intersection trilogy. It was released on June 30, 2021, by Brand New Music and distributed by Kakao Entertainment. The EP consists of five tracks, including the lead single, "Moonlight" and its instrumental. The physical version of the EP is available in five versions: photobook type which consists of "Contact" and "Element" and jewel case type which consists of three versions that are made especially for each member.

Background and release 
On June 11, 2021, Brand New Music released a set of individual teaser photos and the release date for the third EP The Intersection: Contact. On June 15, they released a group teaser photo with the phrase "they contact each other through their own moon" written on it. On June 16–18, they released three sets of the concept photos for The Intersection: Contact. On June 22, the tracklist for the EP was released, revealing "Moonlight" as the lead single. On June 23, the lyric teaser video for "Moonlight" was released. On June 24, the first music video teaser for "Moonlight" was released. On June 25, they released the preview video for the EP. They released the second music video teaser for "Moonlight" on June 29.

On June 30, they released The Intersection: Contact along with the music video for "Moonlight".

Promotion 
BDC promoted the single "Moonlight" at Mnet's M Countdown, KBS2's Music Bank, MBC's Show! Music Core, SBS's Inkigayo, and SBS MTV's The Show.

Track listing

Charts

Release history

References 

2021 EPs
BDC (group) albums
Korean-language EPs